Natanael Gärde (27 July 1880 – 28 January 1968) was a Swedish judge who served as the minister of justice between 1930 and 1932.

Early life and education
Gärde was born in Seglora parish, Älvsborg county, on 27 July 1880. His parents were Johannes Bengtsson and Hedda Andersdtr. He received a degree in law from Uppsala University.

Career
On 7 June 1926 Gärde was appointed minister of state to the cabinet led by Premier Carl Gustaf Ekman. His term ended on 2 October 1928. He was named minister of justice on 7 June 1930 and remained in the office until 24 September 1932. During his tenure Gärde managed to implement a proposal of the former minister Johan Thyrén in which fines to the detainees ability to pay were regulated. After leaving office Gärde headed the procedural law commission which was formed by his successor as minister of justice Karl Schlyter to reform the legal framework of Sweden in 1938.

Personal life and death
Gärde married Märta Brink in 1909. Their daughter was Ingrid Gärde Widemar who was also a jurist and politician. Natanael Gärde died in Stockholm on 28 January 1968.

Awards
Gärde was awarded the Illis quorum by the Swedish government in 1948.

References

External links

20th-century Swedish lawyers
20th-century Swedish politicians
1880 births
1968 deaths
Uppsala University alumni
Swedish jurists
Swedish Ministers for Justice
Recipients of the Illis quorum